The men's marathon at the 2017 World Championships in Athletics was held on 6 August, starting and finishing on Tower Bridge.

Summary
The race started off with a tight pack running at a leisurely pace. 10 kilometres into the race, the British crowds were pleased to see Callum Hawkins in the lead, but there were 59 others in the lead pack. By 15 kilometres there were still 31 and by half way only another three had started to fall off the back. Then the racing began as a small group went off the front including the entire Kenyan team, a Kenyan Turkish transplant, two Ethiopians, two Eritreans, Alphonce Simbu from Tanzania and Hawkins. Of that group, Geoffrey Kirui, Tamirat Tola and Gideon Kipketer were pushing the pace as a three man pack. Kipketer faltered and it was a two man race with Simbu breaking off the front of the second pack. About 10 kilometres from the finish, Tola tried to break away. But the one breaking was Tola as Kirui came back and then set off on his own. Over the last seven kilometres, Kirui opened up almost a minute and half of daylight, comfortably crossing the line for the gold. Tola struggled to successfully hold off Simbu to keep silver while an inspired Hawkins picked up the pieces and finished a strong fourth just 26 seconds back.

Records
Before the competition records were as follows:

No records were set at the competition.

Qualification standard
The standard to qualify automatically for entry was 2:19.00.

Results
The final took place on 6 August at 10:54. The results were as follows:

References

marathon
Marathons at the World Athletics Championships
World Championships
Marathons in the United Kingdom
Men's marathons